Joe Kelly (born July 1, 1937) was a Canadian football player who played for the Ottawa Rough Riders. He won the Grey Cup with them in 1960. He played college football for the New Mexico State University.

References

1937 births
Ottawa Rough Riders players
New Mexico State Aggies football players
Living people